Appler is a surname. Notable people with the surname include:

Barton Appler Bean (1860–1947), American ichthyologist
Johann Appler (1892–1978), German Nazi politician
Kathleen Appler, American Roman Catholic nun

See also 
Appler-Englar House, is a historic home located at New Windsor, Carroll County, Maryland